was a village located in Satsuma District, Kagoshima Prefecture, Japan.

As of 2003, the village had an estimated population of 838 and the density of 96.54 persons per km2. The total area was 8.68 km2.

On October 12, 2004, Kashima, along with the city of Sendai, the towns of Hiwaki, Iriki, Kedōin and Tōgō, and the villages of Kamikoshiki, Sato and Shimokoshiki (all from Satsuma District), was merged to create the city of Satsumasendai.

Dissolved municipalities of Kagoshima Prefecture